Howard Harrison Dunn (1867–1942) was a Minnesota Republican politician and a Speaker of the Minnesota House of Representatives.

Biography
Howard H. Dunn was born in Jackson, Minnesota on October 29, 1867.

Dunn was city attorney for Fairmont, Minnesota, and was elected to the Minnesota Senate in 1896. He served only one term in the Senate, but was elected to the Minnesota House of Representatives in 1910, where he was immediately selected as speaker, a position he held until 1913. Dunn died in San Antonio, Texas on May 7, 1942.

References

1867 births
1942 deaths
Republican Party members of the Minnesota House of Representatives
Republican Party Minnesota state senators
Speakers of the Minnesota House of Representatives
People from Fairmont, Minnesota